Shoaib is an Urdu islamic male given name of Arabic origin (cf. Shuaib), which to a much lesser extent is also used as a surname. Notable people with this name include:

Surname 
 Muhammad Shoaib (1907–1997), Pakistani finance minister
 Samia Shoaib (born 1983), Pakistani-British actress, filmmaker and writer

Given name 

 Shoaib Aamer (born 1968), Pakistani former cricketer
 Shoaib Abbasi (born 1956), Pakistani-American business executive
 Shoaib Ahmed (businessman) (born 1964), Indian entrepreneur
 Shoaib Ahmed (Indian cricketer) (born 1987), Indian cricketer
 Shoaib Ahmed (Pakistani cricketer) (born 1990), Pakistani cricketer
 Shoaib Ahmed Shaikh, Pakistani fraudster
 Shoaib Akhtar (born 1975), former Pakistani cricketer
 Shoaib Akhtar (cricketer, born 1982), Pakistani cricketer
 Shoaib Hashmi (born 1995), Pakistani playwright and actor
 Shoaib Ibrahim (born 1987), Indian television actor
 Shoaib Iqbal, Indian politician
 Shoaib Khaliq (born 1991), Pakistani cricketer
 Shoaib Khan (born 1985), Pakistani cricketer
 Shoaib Khan (cricketer, born 1978) (born 1978), Pakistani cricketer
 Shoaib Malik (born 1982), Pakistani cricketer
 Shoaib Mansoor (born 1952), Pakistani television and film director
 Shoaib Mir, Pakistani bureaucrat
 Shoaib Mohammad (born 1961), former Pakistani cricketer
 Shoaib Nasir (born 1983), Pakistani cricketer
 Shoaib Sarwar (born 1986), United Arab Emirates cricketer
 Shoaib Shaikh (born 1987), Indian cricketer
 Muhammad Shoaib Siddiqui (born 1969), Pakistani politician
 Shoaib Sultan (born 1973), Norwegian analyst and politician of Pakistani descent
 Shoaib Sultan Khan (born 1933), Pakistani social worker
 Shoaib Tauheed (1960–2007), Pakistani physiologist

References 

Urdu masculine given names
Urdu-language surnames